Kurt İsmail Hakkı Pasha (1818 – 1897) was an Ottoman Kurdish field marshal, who participated in the Russo-Turkish War of 1877–78.

References

1818 births
1897 deaths
Ottoman Army generals
People from Kars
Field marshals of the Ottoman Empire